Haskill Nunatak is an elongate nunatak,  high, standing  west of Dyrdal Peak in the southern Forrestal Range of the Pensacola Mountains, Antarctica. It was mapped by the United States Geological Survey from surveys and U.S. Navy air photos, 1956–66, and was named by the Advisory Committee on Antarctic Names for Robert E. Haskill, a radioman at Ellsworth Station in the winter of 1957.

References

Nunataks of Queen Elizabeth Land